This article is about the particular significance of the year 1759 to Wales and its people.

Incumbents
Lord Lieutenant of North Wales (Lord Lieutenant of Anglesey, Caernarvonshire, Flintshire, Merionethshire, Montgomeryshire) – George Cholmondeley, 3rd Earl of Cholmondeley 
Lord Lieutenant of Glamorgan – Other Windsor, 4th Earl of Plymouth
Lord Lieutenant of Brecknockshire and Lord Lieutenant of Monmouthshire – Thomas Morgan
Lord Lieutenant of Cardiganshire – Wilmot Vaughan, 3rd Viscount Lisburne
Lord Lieutenant of Carmarthenshire – George Rice
Lord Lieutenant of Denbighshire – Richard Myddelton
Lord Lieutenant of Pembrokeshire – Sir William Owen, 4th Baronet
Lord Lieutenant of Radnorshire – Howell Gwynne

Bishop of Bangor – John Egerton
Bishop of Llandaff – Richard Newcome
Bishop of St Asaph – Robert Hay Drummond
Bishop of St Davids – Anthony Ellys

Events
19 September - The Dowlais Iron Company is formed.
date unknown - Evan Davies resigns as head of the Welsh Academy, following a rift between the Presbyterian and Congregational Fund Boards.

Arts and literature

New books
Blodeu-gerdd Cymry (ed. Dafydd Jones)
Mathias Maurice - Social Religion Exemplify'd
John Wesley - Primitive Physick, translated by John Evans of Bala

Births
1 January - Joseph Foster-Barham, owner of the Trecŵn estate (died 1832)
11 February - John Rice Jones, Welsh-born American politician (died 1824)
16 March - Sir John Nicholl, politician and judge (died 1838)
7 August - William Owen Pughe, lexicographer (died 1835)
10 September - George Herbert, 11th Earl of Pembroke (died 1827)
18 October - Theophilus Jones, historian (died 1812)
date unknown -
William Aubrey, engineer (died 1827)
David Thomas ("Dafydd Ddu Eryri"), (died 1822)

Deaths
11 August - John Heylyn, Welsh-descended clergyman, 74
27 September - Isaac Maddox, Bishop of St Asaph, 62
2 November - Charles Hanbury Williams, diplomat and satirist, 50

References

Wales
Wales